Walking in the Light is a compilation album of gospel songs by Cliff Richard. It is particularly notable as being one of the best selling contemporary Christian music (CCM) albums during the 1980s in the UK.

The album's tracks were all originally released during Richard's renaissance period of the late 1970s and early 1980s on his studio albums, live albums, and the B-side of his pop singles. The track selection wraps up most of the Gospel tracks Richard released in the period that were not included on his two Gospel studio albums of the period, Small Corners (1978) and Now You See Me, Now You Don't (1982). A follow-up gospel compilation album It's a Small World was released the following year (1985), but it only contained two tracks not already available on earlier Richard albums; namely, "Tiny Planet" (previously unreleased) and "Moving In" (B-side of "Carrie", 1980).

Track listing

As per the album liner notes and record centre-label:

References

External links
Tony Jasper's Crisis Magazine June 2012

1984 albums
Cliff Richard albums
Contemporary Christian music albums by English artists